The Tempo Alcoa was a jet-powered hydroplane designed and built by Les Staudacher, using Aluminum Company of America (ALCOA) aluminum. Hydroplane driver and band leader Guy Lombardo for the sake of setting a new world speed record on water.

A new record was never achieved by the Tempo Alcoa.

References

Jet-powered hydroplanes
Alcoa